Jean-Philippe Dayraut (born 14 April 1969 in Toulouse, France) is a French auto racing driver. He has won the Andros Trophy ice racing championship fours times between 2009 and 2013. Also, he developed the Mitjet silhouette racecars and is manager of the Circuit d’Albi.

Racing career

Andros Trophy
Dayraut won his first Andros Trophy title in 2009 and went on to defend it successfully in 2010 and 2011 while driving a Škoda Fabia. He switched to the Mini Countryman for 2012 and went into the final round in contention for the title but lost out to former Formula One driver Alain Prost. He won his fourth title in 2013, following up with two more titles the following years.

World Touring Car Championship
Dayraut joined the ANOME team for the 2013 World Touring Car Championship season, driving a BMW 320 TC on a race–by–race basis starting with the season opening Race of Italy. He qualified in 23rd place and achieved a best finished of eleventh in race one.

Racing record

24 Hours of Le Mans results

Complete World Touring Car Championship results
(key) (Races in bold indicate pole position) (Races in italics indicate fastest lap)

References

External links
Profile at fiawtcc.com
Profile at Driver Database

1969 births
Sportspeople from Toulouse
French racing drivers
24 Hours of Le Mans drivers
Eurocup Mégane Trophy drivers
FIA GT Championship drivers
World Touring Car Championship drivers
Living people
International GT Open drivers
European Rallycross Championship drivers
Epsilon Euskadi drivers
Saintéloc Racing drivers